Leonard George William Boot (4 November 1899 – 23 November 1937) was an English footballer who played in the Football League for Huddersfield Town, Fulham, Bradford City and Nottingham Forest. He made 15 appearances in all competitions for York City in the 1923–24 season. He was born in West Bromwich and died in that town at the age of 38 following a motorcycle accident.

He was at Huddersfield when they won the First Division in 1923–24 and 1924–25, though he only made 5 appearances in each season, meaning he did not qualify for a medal.

For Bradford City, he made 7 appearances in the Football League.

References 

1899 births
Sportspeople from West Bromwich
1937 deaths
English footballers
Association football goalkeepers
York City F.C. players
Huddersfield Town A.F.C. players
Fulham F.C. players
Bradford City A.F.C. players
Nottingham Forest F.C. players
Caernarfon Town F.C. players
Worcester City F.C. players
English Football League players
Midland Football League players
Motorcycle road incident deaths
Road incident deaths in England